"" is the national anthem of Sri Lanka. "Sri Lanka Matha" was composed by Ananda Samarakoon and was originally titled "Namo Namo Matha" ("Salute! Salute! Motherland").

"Sri Lanka Matha" was first performed at an official ceremony on 4 February 1949 at the Independence Memorial Hall in Torrington Square during the national day ceremony. The anthem was given full constitutional recognition in the 1978 Second Republican Constitution.

History 

There are differing accounts as to the origin of the "Sri Lanka Matha". The most widely held view is that Sri Lankan composer Ananda Samarakoon wrote the music and lyrics to the song, inspired/influenced by the Indian Bengali poet Rabindranath Tagore. A minority suggest that Tagore wrote the anthem in full. Some have suggested that Tagore wrote the music whilst Samarakoon wrote the lyrics. Tagore being directly involved in the creation of the song has been denied by some historians like Indian Lipi Ghosh and Sri Lankan Sandagomi Coperahewa. Samarakoon had been a pupil of Tagore at Visva-Bharati University, Santiniketan. After returning to Ceylon Samarakoon taught music at Mahinda College, Galle. The song, which was then known as "Namo Namo Mata", was first sung by students at Mahinda College. After it was sung by the choir from Musaeus College, Colombo at a public event it became hugely popular in Ceylon and was widely played on radio.

Prior to Ceylon's independence (1948) the Lanka Gandharva Sabha had organised a competition to find a national anthem. Among the entries were "Namo Namo Matha" by Samarakoon and "Sri Lanka Matha Pala Yasa Mahima" by P. B. Illangasinghe and Lionel Edirisinghe. The latter won the competition but this was controversial as Illangasinghe and Edirisinghe were members of the judging panel. "Sri Lanka Matha Pala Yasa Mahima" was broadcast by Radio Ceylon on the morning of 4 February 1948, independence day, but it was not sung at the official Freedom Day celebrations. Ceylon continued to use the UK's national anthem as its official national anthem after independence. At the first independence day ceremony held on 4 February 1949 at the Independence Memorial Hall in Torrington Square both "Namo Namo Matha" and "Sri Lanka Matha Pala Yasa Mahima" were sung, in Sinhala and Tamil, as "national songs".

More specifically, in 1950 Minister of Finance J. R. Jayewardene requested that the government recognise Samarakoon's "Namo Namo Matha" as the official national anthem. The government appointed a committee headed by Edwin Wijeyeratne, Minister of Home Affairs and Rural Development, to pick a new national anthem. The committee heard several songs but, after much deliberation, picked "Namo Namo Matha". The committee made a minor change to Samarakoon's song, with his approval, changing the tenth line from "Nawajeewana Damine Newatha Apa Awadi Karan Matha" to "Nawa Jeewana Demine Nithina Apa Pubudu Karan Matha". The committee's decision was endorsed by the government on 22 November 1951. The anthem was translated into the Tamil language by M. Nallathamby. "Namo Namo Matha" was first sung as Ceylon's official national anthem at the independence day parade in Colombo in 1952.

In the late 1950s controversy arose over its first line, "Namo Namo Matha, Apa Sri Lanka". It was deemed to be "unlucky" and blamed for the country's misfortunes including the deaths of two prime ministers. In February 1961 the government changed the line to their present form, "Sri Lanka Matha, Apa Sri Lanka", despite Samarakoon's strong opposition. Samarakoon committed suicide in April 1962, leaving a note complaining that its lyrics had been mutilated.

The Second Republican Constitution of 1978 gave "Sri Lanka Matha" constitutional recognition.

Multilingual 
The Sri Lankan national anthem is available in an identical version in two languages, Sinhala and Tamil, both official languages of the country. It is just one of a number that are sung in more than one language: Belgium (French, Dutch, and German), Canada (English, French and Inuktitut), Finland (Finnish, Swedish), New Zealand (English and Māori), South Africa (Xhosa, Zulu, Sesotho, Afrikaans and English), Suriname (Dutch and Sranan Tongo) and Switzerland (German, French, Italian and Romansh).

"Sri Lanka Thaaye", the Tamil version of the Sri Lankan national anthem, is an exact translation of "Sri Lanka Matha", the Sinhala version, and has the same music. Although it has existed since independence in 1948 it was generally only sung in the north and east of the country where the Tamil language predominates. The Sinhala version of the Constitution uses Sinhala lyrics while the Tamil version of the constitution uses Tamil lyrics. Per the constitution both Sinhala and Tamil are official and national languages and thus the anthem could be sung in both languages.

The majority of Sri Lankans (around 75%) speak the Sinhala language. More specifically, "Tamil is the native language for the Tamil people, who constitute about 15% of Sri Lankans, and for Muslims who are nearly 10%", according to the BBC. Until early 2016, the Sinhala version was the only one to be used during official government events and it was the only version used during international sports and other events. Although the Sinhala version of the anthem was used at official/state events, the Tamil version was also sung at some events in spite of the unofficial ban which ended in early 2016. 

The Sinhala version of Sri Lanka Matha was used in all parts of the country with the exception of the North and the East which have a large Tamil population. Some reports indicate that the Tamil version was used at official events held in the Tamil speaking regions in the North and East of Sri Lanka. The Tamil version was sung at Tamil medium schools throughout the country. The Tamil version was even used during the period when Sinhala was the only official language of the country (1956–87).

Tamil version controversy 
On 12 December 2010 The Sunday Times reported that the Cabinet of Sri Lanka headed by President Mahinda Rajapaksa had taken the decision to scrap the Tamil translation of "Sri Lanka Matha" at official and state functions, as "in no other country was the national anthem used in more than one language" - even though the national anthems of Belgium, Switzerland, Canada and those of several other countries have more than one language version. The Cabinet's decision had followed a paper on the national flag and national anthem produced by Public Administration and Home Affairs Minister W. D. J. Senewiratne. The paper had drawn on the Singaporean model where the national anthem is sung in the official lyrics and not any translation of the lyrics. Based on this the paper recommended that the Sri Lankan national anthem only be sung in Sinhala and the Tamil translation be abolished. The paper's authors had failed to realise that the official lyrics of the Singaporean national anthem are in Malay, a minority language (75% of Singaporeans are Chinese).

Government minister Wimal Weerawansa had labelled the Tamil version a "joke" on Derana TV, and had cited India as an analogy. Some journalists, such as D. B. S. Jeyaraj, claimed that it was wrong of Weerawansa  to cite India as an analogy because according to them the Indian national anthem was not in Hindi, which is the most widely spoken language of India, but in Bengali, a minority language. Although sources based on an official Government of India website state that the Indian National anthem was adopted in its Hindi version by the Constituent Assembly of India, the proceedings of the Constituent Assembly of India on 24 January 1950 does not mention that the National Anthem was "adopted", nor does it mention that it was done so in its Hindi version. In actual practice the unaltered Bengali version is the version sung as the National Anthem, with its words in original Bengali Tatsama, a highly Sanskritized form of Bengali that has Sanskrit words common to both Hindi and Bengali.

The Cabinet's December 2010 decision to scrap the Tamil translation of the anthem (which was not subsequently enacted) caused much furore in Sri Lanka. Later, the government denied allegations that the Tamil translation was to be abolished. The Presidential Secretariat has stated that there was no basis to the media report and follow up reports which intimated the same. Nevertheless, an unofficial ban on the Tamil version came into being as fearful public officials in Tamil speaking areas stopped using the Tamil version or blocked attempts to use it. The Sri Lankan Army forcefully stopped any use of the Tamil version and taught school children to sing only the Sinhala version.

In March 2015 newly elected President Maithripala Sirisena announced that he would be issuing a circular which would state that there was no ban on singing the national anthem in Tamil. Sirisena's announcement was attacked by Sinhalese Buddhist nationalists.

During Sri Lanka's 68th national independence day celebrations on 4 February 2016, the Tamil version of the anthem was sung for the first time since 1949 at an official government event, the independence day celebrations. Lifting of the unofficial ban on the Tamil version had been approved by President Maithripala Sirisena (who had said he would unite the nation after the nearly 26-year civil war that ended in 2009) and by others in the government. This step was viewed as part of the plan for "post-civil war ethnic reconciliation".

Naturally, Sri Lanka Matha was also sung in Sinhalese. Some groups, and Sri Lanka's former President Mahinda Rajapaksa, were opposed to the government officially allowing the Tamil version to be sung. 

In 2020, the Sri Lankan government stopped using the Tamil version of the national anthem at the main Independence Day celebration. However, regional independence day celebrations including those with government involvement in regions with significant Tamil populations continue to sing in both Tamil and Sinhala.

Lyrics

Sinhala version

Tamil version

Poetic English translation

Notes

See also
Sri Lankan Civil War
Tamil Eelam

References

External links 

 National Anthems: Sri Lanka
 National Anthems: Sri Lanka (archive link)
 Himnuszok: Sri Lanka
 National Country Symbols Of All Countries: Sri Lanaka

1940 songs
1951 in Ceylon
Asian anthems
National anthems
National symbols of Sri Lanka
Rabindra Sangeet
National anthem compositions in C major